Erdgeist is the Spirit of the Earth whom Johann Wolfgang von Goethe describes in Faust, Part 1. 'Du, Geist der Erde, bist mir näher; schon fühl ich meine Kräfte höher,...Goethe depicts Erdgeist as a timeless being who endlessly weaves at the Time-Loom—both in life and in death. In this conception, Erdgeist is the means by which the immaterial becomes manifest.

In the German language, Erdgeist literally means Earth spirit. In the context of German folklore, erdgeist specifically refers to a gnome, the quintessential earth elemental mentioned by Paracelsus.

Erdgeist is also an 1895 play by Frank Wedekind, which formed the basis of a 1923 film directed by Leopold Jessner.

Characters in Goethe's Faust
Fictional gnomes
Earth spirits